The Acadiana Railway Company  is a short line railroad based in Opelousas, Louisiana.  It operates on the following trackage:

 Crowley–Eunice, 
 by trackage rights on property of the Union Pacific Railroad, Eunice–Opelousas, 
 Opelousas–Bunkie, Louisiana, 
 switching tracks at Opelousas, 
 per lease since September 2000, McCall–Lula (Thibodeaux Industrial Lead, owned by Union Pacific, in Donaldsonville),  (Out of Service)

The Crowley-Eunice line was built by the New Orleans, Texas and Mexico Railway before 1900. The Opelusas-Eunice and Opelusas-Bunkie lines are former Missouri Pacific lines and were sold to the newly established Acadiana Railway Company in October 1990.  The company started business on October 15, 1990, with the acquired trackage from Missouri Pacific and from Union Pacific. The company is controlled by Trac-Work Inc.

Fleet
The AKDN fleet, as of October 2019, consists of the following 8 locomotives:

References

External links 
 Acadiana Railway on uprr.com

Louisiana railroads
Spin-offs of the Union Pacific Railroad